Miriam Chaszczewacki or Miriam Chaszczewacka (1924–1942) was a 15-year-old Jewish girl and Holocaust victim who in 1939 began writing a personal diary about her life in the Radomsko ghetto which ended a few days before her death in 1942.

Discovery and publication of the diary 
Miriam's teacher Stefania Heilbrunn returned to Radomsko, Poland after World War II had ended. While she was visiting the city cemetery, she met a Polish woman who gave her a sealed envelope saying: "My son has asked me to give this to you. I don't know anything about it" and left. In the envelope Heilbrunn found a notebook with handwriting she recognized as belonging to her former student, Miriam Chaszczewacki. Heilbrunn brought the notebook to Israel and published its content.

Originally the diary was written in Polish. Parts of the diary were published in Hebrew, Yiddish, Polish, English and German. The original notebook was donated to Yad Vashem.

Life 
Miriam's mother Sarah Lavit Zelber, born to a Hassidic family was a kindergarten teacher and a public figure. Miriam's father David was born in Ukraine. He opened a Jewish school in Radomsko where he taught Hebrew. This school was later active in the ghetto. Miriam's brother Nahum was born in 1929. Miriam was a 15-year-old gymnasium student and a member of a Zionist youth movement when the war began. She is described as a gentle, sensitive, intelligent and talented girl who studied Hebrew in her father's school. In another testimony, she is described as a shy, romantic and dreamy teenager.

Miriam's father and brother were murdered in the ghetto by the Germans. The father, David, was killed for refusing to board a deportation train. The brother Nahum was buried in a mass grave in the Jewish cemetery.

Chapters of the diary 
The diary begins with the introductory chapter that describes the events between the summer of 1939 and the occupation of Radomsko by the Germans in September 1939. The second part of the diary consists of 27 dated entries starting at 21 April 1941 describing the events of the war and ghetto life along with the typical account of a teenage girl's emotions.

Death 
The last entry in the diary in Miriam's handwriting was on 7 October 1942, when Miriam was 18. Between 9 and 12 October 1942 about 14,000 residents of the ghetto were sent to Treblinka.

In the last page of the notebook appears an entry in a different, adult, handwriting, possibly by the Polish policeman who was the son of the woman who passed the notebook to Stefania Heilbrunn:

On the evening of the 24 October 1942 she surrendered, together with her mother, to a Polish policeman on duty on Limanewskeigo Str. They asked to be taken to the Judenrat, as they have been hiding for a week in a lavatory and had enough of it all. During the last 3 days they ate raw groats. They were taken to the Police station and the next day left with a transport by lorry to Częstochowa.

In one of the diary's last entries, about a month before her death, Miriam wrote:

It may seem silly, but only a step away from death I still worry about my diary. I would not want for it to meet a miserable end in an oven or on a rubbish heap. I wish somebody could find it – even if it be only a German – and would read it. I wish that these scribblings, though they record barely a fraction of the cruelties, would one day serve as a true and faithful document of our times.

See also
 List of Holocaust diarists
 List of diarists

References

Further reading 
 Children of Dust and Heaven: A Collective memoir, Cape Town: S. Heilbrunn, 1978.
 Stefania Heilbrunn; Miriam Chaszczewacki, Children of Dust and Heaven: A Diary from Nazi Occupation Through the Holocaust; A Collective Memoir, new ed., Pacific Palisades, Calif.: Remember Point, 2012.
 "KINDER AUS STAUB UND HIMMEL: EIN TAGEBUCH AUS DER NS-BESATZUNGSZEIT WÄHREND DES HOLOCAUSTS: GERMAN EDITION" by Stefania Heilbrunn

External links 
History of the Radomsko ghetto (Polish), including portions of Miriam's diary on the Radomsko history museum site
Student film inspired by the diary
Miriam Chaszczewacki’s Diary, Europeana

Polish diarists
Polish women writers
People who died in ghettos in Nazi-occupied Europe
Jewish women writers
Women diarists
1924 births
1942 deaths
Holocaust diarists
Polish Jews who died in the Holocaust